Romanian Mexicans are Mexicans with full or partial Romanian ancestry. Most of them work in Mexico as either professionals, concert artists, merchants or actors. According to the 2020 census of INEGI, there are 569 Romanians residing in Mexico.

Demographics 
2010 - 246 

2020 - 569

Notable Romanians

Romanians living in Mexico 
 Joana Benedek, actress.
 Gheorghe Gruia, handball player and coach.
 Andrea Noli, French actress of Romanian descent.
 Anca Mateescu, canoeist.

Mexicans of Romanian descent 
 Alan Tacher, conductor.
 Humberto Elizondo, actor and son of the great actress and comedian Fanny Kaufman.
 Mark Tacher, actor.

See also 

 Immigration to Mexico
 Mexico–Romania relations

References 

Romanian diaspora
Mexican people of Romanian descent
European Mexican